Staraya Olshanka is a rural locality (a selo) in Starovedugskoye Rural Settlement, Semiluksky District, Voronezh Oblast, Russia. The population was 383 as of 2010. There are 7 streets.

Geography 
Staraya Olshanka is located on the Olshanka River, 57 km northwest of Semiluki (the district's administrative centre) by road. Staraya Veduga is the nearest rural locality.

References 

Rural localities in Semiluksky District